Jérémy Georges Henri Lempereur (born 29 November 1987) is a French footballer who plays for [FC FAY BOUVRON] as an attacking midfielder.

Club career
Lempereur was born in Saint-Nazaire, and was a RC Lens youth graduate. After representing the reserves, US Albi and Arras Football Association, he moved abroad in July 2009, after agreeing to a contract with Segunda División B side AD Alcorcón.

Lempereur helped the team promote to Segunda División, by appearing in 35 matches in all competitions, including 27 minutes in the Alcorconazo. He made his debut in the Spanish second level on 18 September, coming on as a second-half substitute for Samuel Baños in a 3–1 home win against Girona FC, and scored his first goal the following 17 April, by netting the equalizer in a 3–2 home defeat of CD Tenerife.

On 10 July 2011, Lempereur signed for CD Leganés in the third division. He left the club two days later, after alleging "personal problems", and after failed trials at Standard de Liège and former club Lens, he returned to Spain after joining UD Salamanca in the same division.

On 25 July 2012, Lempereur moved to fellow third division side Tenerife. After appearing rarely, he cut ties with the club, and signed with Belgian side UR La Louvière Centre on 30 December.

In the following four years, Lempereur featured only in the lower leagues of France and Belgium, representing Arras, RWS Bruxelles, FCV Dender EH, La Roche VF and Luçon FC. In August 2016 he switched teams and countries again, joining Andorra's UE Engordany.

On 15 June 2017, Lempereur joined FC Santa Coloma, but moved to Louhans-Cuiseaux FC shortly after.

References

External links

1987 births
Living people
Sportspeople from Saint-Nazaire
French footballers
Association football defenders
Championnat National 2 players
Championnat National 3 players
RC Lens players
Arras FA players
La Roche VF players
Louhans-Cuiseaux FC players
USSA Vertou players
Segunda División players
Segunda División B players
AD Alcorcón footballers
UD Salamanca players
CD Tenerife players
Challenger Pro League players
Belgian Third Division players
UR La Louvière Centre players
RWS Bruxelles players
F.C.V. Dender E.H. players
FC Santa Coloma players
French expatriate footballers
French expatriate sportspeople in Spain
French expatriate sportspeople in Belgium
French expatriate sportspeople in Andorra
Expatriate footballers in Spain
Expatriate footballers in Belgium
Expatriate footballers in Andorra
UE Engordany players
Footballers from Loire-Atlantique